Twisted Obsession is a 1989 Spanish-French erotic thriller directed by Fernando Trueba and starring Jeff Goldblum and Miranda Richardson. It consists of an adaptation of the 1976 novel The Dream of the Mad Monkey by Christopher Frank.

Goldblum stars as a screenwriter who becomes involved with a young incestuous brother and sister.

Plot

Cast

Production 
The screenplay was penned by Trueba,  and Menno Meyjes. Shot in English, the film is a Spanish-French co-production, produced by Iberoamericana in association with French 
Production, International Production and Sofica Valor. Shooting took place in Paris and Madrid.

Release 
The film screened at the 46th Venice International Film Festival in September 1989.

Accolades 

|-
| align = "center" rowspan = "11" | 1990 || rowspan = "11" | 4th Goya Awards || colspan = "2" | Best Film ||  || rowspan = "11" | 
|-
| Best Director || Fernando Trueba ||  
|-
| Best Art Direction || Pierre-Louis Thévenet || 
|-
| Best Production Supervision || José López Rodero || 
|-
| Best Cinematography || José Luis Alcaine || 
|-
| Best Adapted Screenplay || Fernando Trueba, Manolo Matji, Menno Meyjes ||  
|-
| Best Makeup and Hairstyles || José Antonio Sánchez, Paquita Núñez || 
|-
| Best Editing || Carmen Frías || 
|-
| Best Original Score || Antoine Duhamel || 
|-
| Best Sound || Eduardo Fernández, Georges Prat, Pablo Blanco || 
|-
| Special Effects || Christian Bourqui || 
|}

References 

1989 films
1980s Spanish-language films
1980s English-language films
Films directed by Fernando Trueba
1980s erotic thriller films
French erotic thriller films
Spanish erotic thriller films
Incest in film
Films based on French novels
Films shot in Madrid
Best Film Goya Award winners
English-language French films
English-language Spanish films
1989 multilingual films
French multilingual films
Spanish multilingual films
1980s Spanish films
1980s French films